Catuna angustatum, the large pathfinder, is a butterfly in the family Nymphalidae. It is found in Sierra Leone, Liberia, Ivory Coast, Ghana, Togo, Nigeria, Cameroon, Gabon, the Republic of the Congo, the Central African Republic, the Democratic Republic of the Congo, Uganda (western areas to Semuliki National Park), Rwanda and Tanzania. The habitat consists of forests.

The larvae feed on Manilkara obovata, Mimusops kummel, Malacantha alnifolia and Aningueria robusta.

References

External links
NSG database Catuna angustatum Felder 1867 image

Butterflies described in 1867
Limenitidinae
Butterflies of Africa
Taxa named by Baron Cajetan von Felder
Taxa named by Rudolf Felder